Ctenogobiops tangaroai, the Tangaroan shrimp-goby, is a species of goby of the family Gobiidae, native to the reefs of the Pacific Ocean where it can be found in fine-grained sand patches at depths of from .  This species is commensal with alpheid shrimps, with a fish and shrimp sharing a burrow.  This species can reach a length of  TL.  It can also be found in the aquarium trade.

References

External links

tangaroai
Taxa named by Roger Lubbock
Taxa named by Nicholas Vladimir Campbel Polunin
Fish described in 1977